Christopher Xavier Chiozza (born November 21, 1995) is an American professional basketball player for the Long Island Nets of the NBA G League. He played college basketball for the Florida Gators. Chiozza won an NBA championship with the Warriors in 2022.

High school career
Chiozza attended White Station High School, where he was coached by Jesus Patino. He also played on the Team Thad AAU team. As a junior, in the wake of his grandmother's death, he posted averages of 27 points, seven assists and seven steals in an important Pittsburgh tournament and began to get major college looks. He averaged 15 points and eight assists per game as a senior. Chiozza was ranked No. 45 in his class by Rivals.com and received scholarship offers from Auburn, UMass, Memphis, Ohio State, Richmond and Tennessee before committing to Florida.

College career

Playing for Florida in the Sweet Sixteen of the 2017 NCAA tournament, Chiozza hit a 3-pointer at the buzzer to defeat Wisconsin 84–83 in overtime and advance to the Elite Eight. He was thinking of passing but ended up taking the winning shot. As a junior he averaged 7.2 points, 3.8 assists and 3.3 rebounds per game.

Chiozza became a starter as a senior and led the SEC with a 3.22 assist-to-turnover ratio. He had a last-second steal and layup to beat Missouri on January 6, 2018. On March 3, he broke Erving Walker's Florida assists record. On the season he averaged 11.1 points, 6.1 assists and 4.6 rebounds per game. At the conclusion of the regular season he was named to the First Team All-SEC. After the season he was invited to the 2018 Portsmouth Invitational Tournament.

Professional career

Capital City Go-Go (2018–2019)
After going undrafted in the 2018 NBA draft, Chiozza joined the Washington Wizards for the 2018 NBA Summer League. Chiozza would eventually join the Wizards for training camp. He was waived by the Wizards on October 14, 2018, He was added to the team's NBA G League affiliate, the Capital City Go-Go.

Houston Rockets (2019)
On February 22, 2019, Chiozza signed a 10-day contract with the Houston Rockets. He did not appear in any games, but he subsequently played for the Rockets’ G League affiliate, the Rio Grande Valley Vipers.

On March 22, Chiozza signed a contract for the remainder of the 2018–19 season. He played his first NBA game on March 24, seeing 5 minutes of action in a 113–90 blowout win against the New Orleans Pelicans.

On July 30, 2019, Chiozza was waived by the Houston Rockets.

Washington Wizards (2019–2020)
On September 26, 2019, Chiozza re-signed with the Washington Wizards for training camp. He was signed to a two-way contract by the Wizards on October 21. Under the terms of the deal, Chiozza would split time between the Wizards and their G League affiliate, the Capital City Go-Go. On December 17, 2019, the Wizards waived Chiozza. On December 21, 2019, the Capital City Go-Go announced that they had re-acquired Chiozza.

Brooklyn Nets (2020–2021)
On January 4, 2020, the Brooklyn Nets signed Chiozza to a two-way contract. On December 1, Chiozza re-signed with the Nets. He was waived at the conclusion of training camp, but was then re-signed on December 22.

Golden State Warriors (2021–2022)
On August 14, 2021, the Golden State Warriors signed Chiozza to a two-way contract. On June 16, 2022, Chiozza won the 2022 NBA Finals with the Golden State Warriors of the NBA.

Long Island Nets (2022–present)
On September 16, 2022, Chiozza signed with the Brooklyn Nets, who waived him at the end of training camp. On November 4, 2022, Chiozza was named to the opening night roster for the Long Island Nets.

National team career
On February 12, 2019, it was announced that Chiozza was included in FIBA Basketball World Cup qualifying training camp roster for Team USA by the USA Basketball.

Career statistics

NBA

Regular season

|-
| style="text-align:left;"|
| style="text-align:left;"|Houston
| 7 || 0 || 4.7 || .250 || .400 ||  || .6 || .6 || .1 || .1 || .9
|-
| style="text-align:left;"|
| style="text-align:left;"|Washington
| 10 || 0 || 12.3 || .294 || .443 ||  || 1.5 || 2.8 || .1 || .2 || 2.7
|-
| style="text-align:left;"|
| style="text-align:left;"|Brooklyn
| 18 || 2 || 15.4 || .425 || .357 || 1.000 || 2.1 || 3.1 || .6 || .1 || 6.4
|-
| style="text-align:left;"|
| style="text-align:left;"|Brooklyn
| 22 || 1 || 10.5 || .352 || .310 || .765 || 1.1 || 3.0 || .3 || .3 || 4.0
|-
| style="text-align:left; background:#afe6ba;"|
| style="text-align:left;"| Golden State
| 34 || 1 || 10.9 || .296 || .321 || .667 || 1.1 || 1.9 || .4 || .0 || 2.0
|- class="sortbottom"
| style="text-align:center;" colspan="2"|Career
| 91 || 4 || 11.4 || .353 || .343 || .800 || 1.3 || 2.4 || .5 || .1 || 3.3

Playoffs

|-
| style="text-align:left;"|2020
| style="text-align:left;"|Brooklyn
| 4 || 0 || 16.3 || .313 || .333 || .500 || 1.5 || 1.5 || 1.3 || .0 || 5.8
|-
| style="text-align:left;"|2021
| style="text-align:left;"|Brooklyn
| 6 || 0 || 3.2 || .286 || .333 ||  || .2 || .2 || .2 || .0 || .8
|- class="sortbottom"
| style="text-align:center;" colspan="2"|Career 
| 10 || 0 || 8.4 || .323 || .316 || .500 || .7 || 1.8 || .6 || .0 || 2.8

References

External links

 Florida Gators bio

1995 births
Living people
American men's basketball players
Basketball players from Memphis, Tennessee
Brooklyn Nets players
Capital City Go-Go players
Florida Gators men's basketball players
Golden State Warriors players
Houston Rockets players
Long Island Nets players
Point guards
Rio Grande Valley Vipers players
Santa Cruz Warriors players
Undrafted National Basketball Association players
United States men's national basketball team players
Washington Wizards players